Maria or Mary the Copt may refer to:

 Mary the Jewess, early alchemist first appearing in Zosimos of Panopolis' (c. 300) writings
 Maria al-Qibtiyya (died 637), mother of the prophet Muhammad's son